The  New York Giants season was the franchise's 18th season in the National Football League.

Schedule

Note: Intra-division opponents are in bold text.

Standings

See also
List of New York Giants seasons

New York Giants seasons
New York Giants
New York
1940s in Manhattan
Washington Heights, Manhattan